Hotel Sisimiut is a hotel located at Aqqusinersuaq 86, in the northeastern outskirts of Sisimiut, Greenland. It is used regularly for conferences and contains one of the most notable restaurants in the town,  Restaurant Nasaasaaq and Bar Aaveq. The hotel is also notable for its view of the coastline.

See also
 List of hotels in Greenland

References

External links
Official site

Sisimiut
Hotels in Greenland